Carlos Antonio Bernardo Garcés López (25 December 1900 – 21 September 1980) was a Mexican sprinter, footballer, and dental surgeon. Garcés is recognized as one of the founding members of Club América as well as one of the first players to officially represent the Mexico national football team. Garcés is also credited as the founder of the football club Cruz Azul. During his employment at Cemento Cruz Azul in the late 1920s, Garcés personally lobbied for the establishment of a company football team of which he also managed. Ironically the club would become fierce rivals with America decades later. Garcés is also credited for the creation of the siquitibum chant. 

As an Olympian, Garcés competed in the men's 200 metres at the 1924 Summer Olympics. He also competed in the men's football tournament at the 1928 Summer Olympics.

Club career

America
Carlos Garces was one of the founding members of Club America in 1916. From its inception until 1928, he played as a midfielder for the club winning multiple titles in the Primera Fuerza.

Cruz Azul
As football in Mexico was not a lucrative occupation, Garces López, a licensed dentist, found employment at the cement company Cemento Cruz Azul located in the small town of Jasso, Hidalgo providing dental care to its employees. He would travel regularly to Mexico City from Jasso to train and play for America.

In 1925, Cemento Cruz Azul had voted to establish a company baseball team as the sport was popular in the town of Jasso. Garces López, however, personally lobbied for many months to change the official company sport to football. Initially receiving resistance  from American employees, Garces López eventually convinced the company directors to hold a referendum in which the workers would vote on the company team's main sport. On 22 March 1927, the vote was held where it was decided the company team's sport was to change from baseball to football. Cemento Cruz Azul installed a football pitch on the company's premises in place of the baseball field and the football team was officially established on two months later on 22 May where Garces López was appointed head coach of the newly founded team.

International career
Garces López formed part of the first Mexico national football team in 1923. Garces López played in Mexico's first series of official international matches against Guatemala. 

Mexico did not form another national team until the 1928 Summer Olympics where Garces López was once again called up. Garces López played against Spain and Chile national football team where Mexico lost both matches 7-1 and 3-1 respectively.

International appearances

International goals

Later career
From 1937 to 1942 Garcés López was president of the Mexican Football Federation.

References

External links
 

1900 births
1980 deaths
Athletes (track and field) at the 1924 Summer Olympics
Mexican male sprinters
Olympic athletes of Mexico
Place of birth missing
Cruz Azul footballers
Mexican footballers
Mexico international footballers
Olympic footballers of Mexico
Footballers at the 1928 Summer Olympics
Association footballers not categorized by position
20th-century Mexican people